The Cedars is an unincorporated community in Placer County, California. It lies at an elevation of 5,787 feet (1,764 m).

References

Unincorporated communities in California
Unincorporated communities in Placer County, California